Wendy Marion Craig  is a Canadian clinical-developmental psychologist known for her research and advocacy in the field of childhood bullying. She is a professor in the Department of Psychology at Queen's University at Kingston in Ontario, Canada.

Education 
Craig completed a Bachelor of Arts degree at the University of British Columbia in 1985 and a Master of Arts degree from York University in 1989. In 1993, Craig earned her Ph.D. in clinical developmental psychology from York University, under the supervision of Dr. Debra Pepler. For her doctoral dissertation, entitled Naturalistic observations of bullies and victims in the school yard, Craig recorded the interactions of elementary school students and described their bullying experiences (including where incidents occurred and how frequently adults intervened).

Career 
Craig joined the Queen's University faculty in 1994. She currently holds the title of Professor and Department Head in the Department of Psychology.

Craig has published widely on issues related to children's social relationships, including such topics as bullying, cyberbullying, and children's mental health. She also regularly contributes her expertise to television, radio, and print media. In 1997, she and Pepler appeared on an episode of The Oprah Winfrey Show to discuss their work on bullying.

In 2006, Craig and Pepler co-founded Promoting Relationships and Eliminating Violence Network (PREVNet), a collaboration between academics and community organizations dedicated to the prevention of childhood bullying and the promotion of healthy relationships.

Awards and honours 
For her work building PREVNet, Craig was awarded the Social Science and Humanities Research Council Partnership Award in 2014.  

Craig was elected a fellow of the Royal Society of Canada in 2014. She was appointed to the Order of Ontario in 2016 and to the Order of Canada in 2018.

Selected publications

References

External links

York University alumni
University of British Columbia alumni
Academic staff of Queen's University at Kingston
Canadian psychologists
Canadian women psychologists
Developmental psychologists
Fellows of the Royal Society of Canada
Members of the Order of Ontario
Officers of the Order of Canada
Year of birth missing (living people)
Living people